The 1998 NCAA Division I Outdoor Track and Field Championships were contested June 3−6 at University at Buffalo Stadium at the University at Buffalo in Buffalo, New York in order to determine the individual and team national champions of men's and women's collegiate Division I outdoor track and field events in the United States.

These were the 76th annual men's championships and the 17th annual women's championships. This was the Bulls' first time hosting the event.

For the seventh consecutive year, Arkansas topped the men's team standings, finishing seven and a half points ahead of Stanford. It was the seventh of eight consecutive titles for the Razorbacks and their eighth overall.

Texas finished atop the women's team standings for the first time since 1986, claiming their second title in program history. This was the first title since 1986 not claimed by LSU, snapping their streak of eleven straight national titles. The 1986 championship was also the last event hosted by Indiana.

Team results 
 Note: Top 10 only
 (H) = Hosts
 Full results

Men's standings

Women's standings

Men's results

100 meters

200 meters

400 meters

800 meters

1500 meters

3000 meters steeplechase

5000 meters

10,000 meters

110 meters hurdles

400 meters hurdles

4x100-meter relay

4x400-meter relay

High Jump

Pole Vault

Long Jump

Triple Jump

Shot Put

Discus

Hammer throw

Javelin throw

Decathlon

Women's results

100 meters

200 meters

400 meters

800 meters

1500 meters

3000 meters steeplechase

5000 meters

10,000 meters

100 meters hurdles

400 meters hurdles

4x100-meter relay

4x400-meter relay

High Jump

Pole Vault

Long Jump

Triple Jump

Shot Put

Discus

Hammer Throw

Javelin Throw

Heptathlon

References

NCAA Men's Outdoor Track and Field Championship
NCAA Division I Outdoor Track and Field Championships
NCAA Division I Outdoor Track and Field Championships
NCAA Division I Outdoor Track and Field Championships
NCAA Women's Outdoor Track and Field Championship